Patrick Schulte (born March 13, 2001) is an American professional soccer player who plays as a goalkeeper for Columbus Crew in Major League Soccer.

Early years

High school and Saint Louis FC 
Schulte attended Francis Howell High School, where he was a three-time All-Academic selection. Schulte was also a three-year varsity starter on the basketball team and helped the Vikings to a fourth-place finish in the Missouri Class 5A state championship. Schulte played with the Saint Louis FC academy, helping the team advance to the USSDA playoffs in 2019 and later signing a USL academy contract with the team. During his time, Schulte also had a training stint with Dutch side Feyenoord. He appeared for Saint Louis FC on May 15, 2019, starting in a Lamar Hunt U.S. Open Cup fixture against Des Moines Menace, helping the team progress in a penalty shootout win.

College 
In 2019, Schulte committed to playing college soccer at Saint Louis University. In three seasons with the Billikens, Schulte went on to make 51 appearances. In his freshman year, he earned an Atlantic 10 Conference All-Rookie team selection. His sophomore year saw Schulte take Atlantic 10 Conference Defensive Player of the Year and be named A-10 first-team All-Conference. In 2021, he was again named A-10 first-team All-Conference, as well as United Soccer Coaches second-team All-Region, and Most Outstanding Player of the A-10 Championship.

While at college, Schulte also played in the USL League Two, making nine regular season appearances for St. Louis Scott Gallagher during the 2021 season.

On January 6, 2022, it was announced that Schulte would leave college early and sign a Generation Adidas contract with Major League Soccer, allowing him to enter the 2022 MLS SuperDraft.

Club career

Columbus Crew 
On January 11, 2022, Schulte was selected 12th overall by Columbus Crew in the MLS SuperDraft.

In 2022, Schulte spent time with the Crew's MLS Next Pro side Columbus Crew 2.

International
Schulte was called up to the United States national under-20 team in both 2019 and 2020.

Honors
Columbus Crew 2
MLS Next Pro: 2022

Individual
MLS Next Pro Goalkeeper of the Year: 2022
MLS Next Pro Best XI: 2022

References

External links 
 Patrick Schulte at Saint Louis Billikens
 Patrick Schulte at Columbus Crew
 

2001 births
Living people
American soccer players
Association football goalkeepers
Columbus Crew draft picks
Columbus Crew players
Columbus Crew 2 players
MLS Next Pro players
Soccer players from Missouri
People from St. Charles, Missouri
Saint Louis Billikens men's soccer players
Saint Louis FC players
United States men's youth international soccer players
USL League Two players